Amores De Mercado (Love at The Market) is a Spanish-language telenovela produced by the United States-based television network Telemundo and RTI Colombia.  This limited-run series ran for 125 episodes from June 14, 2006 to January 12, 2007.  It aired in Europe and the Middle East on Zone Romantica.

This show was retitled simply Amores in mid-run. Head writer Basilio Alvarez was replaced by Eric Vonn and the storylines and characters went in a new direction. When Telemundo reaired the show in daytime in 2009, the shorter title was used for the entire series. BTV started to  air this telenovela on November 22, 2006 in Bulgaria.

Story
Amores De Mercado tells the story of Fernando (Mauricio Islas), an ambitious man who driven by greed will do the unimaginable to his own family, Lucia (Paola Rey), a woman in search of her husband, and Diego (Michel Brown), an athlete who feels defeated by life. Lucia and Diego will meet and find a reason to love again and start over in life, however, destiny will put them to the test. This is a story of second chances and how love can save us when everything else is lost.

Cast

Script features
When Eric Vonn took the story in his hands, he rewrote all the rest of the story from about episode 40 to the end, and made it in his unique manner providing almost all the dialogues and scenes in ironic, sarcastic manner with many allegories full of black humor. Huge amount of violent and sadistic scenes involving main characters, and the manner of setting this scenes are although comic, all this features make novels of Vonn very different from all telenovela writers, in fact he is the only one writing telenovelas in a genre of black humor.

References

External links
 
  (English, requires Flash)
 Telemundo official site (Spanish)

2006 telenovelas
2007 telenovelas
2006 American television series debuts
2007 American television series endings
2006 Colombian television series debuts
2007 Colombian television series endings
Colombian telenovelas
RTI Producciones telenovelas
Telemundo telenovelas
Caracol Televisión telenovelas
Television series by Universal Television
Spanish-language American telenovelas